Kasi Nayinar Pararacacekaran (died 1570) was of one of the Aryacakravarti rulers of the Jaffna kingdom who followed in the chaotic period after the death of Cankili I(1519–1561), and he directly usurped the previous King Puviraja Pandaram. He was not of royal (famial) lineage, which was vocalized frequently by opposition forces in an attempt to delegitimize his rule and improve their own claims to the Kingship. His enemies, failing to gain widespread public support for overthrowing the popular King eventually approached the Portuguese, who ruled from the Mannar territory. They were a natural ally, as they had both territory and economic ties which were in proximity to the Jaffna kingdom. The Portuguese capitalized on the opportunity presented and began a silent military campaign against King Kasi Nayinar. After a brief battle, in which opposition to the Portuguese forces was limited due to the element of surprise; he was captured, removed from power, and imprisoned. The Portuguese quickly set about appointing a state- sponsored king, yet despite this and other coinciding efforts, along with their quick enactment, the puppet-king became an actual victim to the mob of supporters for Kasi Nayinar within days of proclamation. After Kasi was rescued, and the Portuguese sponsored King was physically disposed of, his self-appointment as the legitimate and ruling King, with full support of the population, was naturally his top priority. He fastly executed this goal, and again he ruled Jaffna. However, after all of the trials and tribulations he experienced throughout his tumultuous ascent to power, the Portuguese kingdom was ultimatley successful in their bid to remove him as one of the few noteworthy 'People's King' with respect to that region and time period. Albiet, it was decided that this time the approach would be outright assassination instead of imprisonmemt or other indirect means. The Portuguese Kingdom managed to infiltrate the inner circle of the Jaffna King, via a servant agreeable to the murder plot of poisoning. Not long after regaining his Kingship, that servant was successful and Kasi Nayinar Pararacacekaran, King of Jaffna, died from the Portuguese directed poisoning.

Notes 

Kings of Jaffna
Sri Lankan Tamil royalty
1570 deaths
Year of birth unknown